Kill for Me is a 2013 American thriller film directed by Michael Greenspan and starring Katie Cassidy and Tracy Spiridakos. The film was released direct-to-video on February 12, 2013.

Plot
Amanda has a violent ex-boyfriend, Cameron. After her roommate Natalie goes missing, Hayley moves in. When Cameron threatens Amanda, Hayley kills him, and they bury his body. In return for helping her, Hayley asks Amanda to assist in getting rid of her abusive father, Garrett.

Cast
 Katie Cassidy as Amanda Rowe  
 Tracy Spiridakos as Hayley Jones
 Donal Logue as Garrett Jones
 Adam DiMarco as Mark  
 Shannon Chan-Kent as Zoe  
 Torrance Coombs as Cameron  
 Chelah Horsdal as Maria Klein
 Ryan Robbins as Detective Ferris  
 Colin Lawrence as Detective Howe  
 Leah Gibson as Natalie Ross  
 Andrew Zachar as Steve  
 Graham Croft as Vet  
 Joanne Wilson as Newscaster  
 Crystal Mudry as Girl Outside Bar

Reception
Ali Davis of AfterEllen said about the film: "Kill for Me is a rainy-day thriller. It's not something you need to alter your life to seek out, but it sure beats getting out of your pajamas on a day when you really don't have to."

Love Horror gave the film two stars out of five, stating: "Drawing from several sources such as Strangers on a Train and Single White Female to name a few, Kill For Me is a twisted tale with a[sic] interesting story that deals with the cycle of abuse and the difficulties people have breaking free".

Ken Tasho of EDGE Media Network wrote: "As per usual, the lesbianism in "Kill for Me" is downplayed and the love affair between Amanda and Hailey is minimal. But the sight of the two female leads dragging dead bodies and playing with guns is outlandish, if not laughable."

References

External links
 
 Gay Cinema: K–LGBTQ Films (Lesbian, Gay, Bi-Sexual, Transgender, Que[e]r), emanuellevy.com

2013 films
2013 direct-to-video films
2013 horror films
2013 horror thriller films
2013 LGBT-related films
American films about revenge
American horror thriller films
American LGBT-related films
Direct-to-video horror films
2010s English-language films
Bisexuality-related films
Lesbian-related films
LGBT-related horror thriller films
Films about stalking
2010s American films